Pomaderris discolor is a species of flowering plant in the family Rhamnaceae and is endemic to south-eastern continental Australia. It is a shrub with woolly-hairy stems, elliptic leaves, and clusters of pale yellowish flowers.

Description

The upper surface of the leaves is glabrous and the lower surface greyish and covered with star-shaped hairs. Flowering occurs in September and October and the fruit is a hairy capsule.

Taxonomy
This species was first formally described in 1804 by Étienne Pierre Ventenat who gave it the name Ceanothus discolor in his book Jardin de la Malmaison. In 1808, Jean Louis Marie Poiret changed the name to Pomaderris discolor.

Distribution and habitat
Pomaderris discolor grows in open forest and rainforest margins between the Crawford River in New South Wales and Sale in eastern Victoria.

References

discolor
Flora of New South Wales
Flora of Victoria (Australia)
Plants described in 1804
Taxa named by Étienne Pierre Ventenat